Konrad Kaspersen (born 1 March 1948 in Tromsø, Norway) is a Norwegian jazz musician (upright bass).

Career 
Kaspersen contributed in Kurt Samuelsen's band, including Henning Gravrok, Kjell Bartholsen and Thorgeir Stubø in the late 70's and early 80's, showing up on scenes like Moldejazz. Throughout the 80's He was also involved in some projects in other genres, as with folk singers such as Trygve Henrik Hoff and Tove Karoline Knutsen, and blues with Chris Lyngedal. As jazz musician he has also toured with Knut Riisnæs, Odd Riisnæs, Per Husby, Øystein Norvoll Quintet and with Rikskonsertene. He has been a regular member of Alf Kjellman's band, and he performed "Blåfrostfestivalen" in 2005, together with Ivar Antonsen and Finn Sletten, as well as at "Chrisfestivalen" in Kjøllefjord, in memory of blues the singer Chris Lyngedal Kaspersen such as was bassist for. Here he festival musician with several constellations.

In the 90's He was regional musician in the band "Jazz i Nord" together with the pianist Jørn Øien, drummer Trond Sverre Hansen and trombonist Øystein B. Blix. This group collaborated with Marit Sandvik releasing the album Song Fall Soft (1995).

Kaspersen has collaborated with the drummer Trond Sverre Hansen, which has laid the foundation for many constellations, among them Hallgeir Pedersen Trio. They were awarded a tour in Norway by "Norsk Jazzforum" (2001), where they appeared on scenes like "Trondheim Jazzfestival". The album West Coast Blues (2002), was recorded at the club "Blå" during the same tour.

Honors 
Stubøprisen 2001

Diskografi 
1976: World of Dreams (Apollo Records), with Ole G. Nilssen
1980: Rækved Og Lørveblues (RCA Victor), with Trygve Henrik Hoff
1987: Den Glade Pessimisten (OK Produksjoner), with Ragnar Olsen & Sverre Kjelsberg
1992: Tenn Lampa (Arctica Label), with Tove Karoline Knutsen
1995: Song, Fall Soft (Taurus Records), with Marit Sandvik
1999: Feskarliv Anno 1900 (Lofotselskapet), with Dag Kajander
2001: Jazz From North Norway (Gemini Music), Distant Reports with various artists
2002: West Coast Blues (Hot Club Records), within Hallgeir Pedersen Trio
2007: June 1999 (Reflect Records), with Alf Kjellman
2008: Feather, But No Wings (Reflect Records), with Alf Kjellman
2008: Kokfesk & Ballader (Grappa Music), compilation with Trygve Henrik Hoff
2008: Dilemma single (Park Grammofon), with Anne Lande & Per Husby
2009: Helt Nær (Park Grammofon), with Anne Lande & Per Husby

References

External links 
Review at Verdens Gang 
Konrad Kaspersen Biography on MIC.no
Hallgeir Pedersen Trio Biography on Ballade.no

Jazz double-bassists
Norwegian jazz upright-bassists
Male double-bassists
Norwegian jazz composers
Male jazz composers
1948 births
Living people
Musicians from Tromsø
21st-century double-bassists
21st-century Norwegian male musicians